Jared Khasa (born 4 November 1997) is a French professional footballer who plays as a forward for AEL Limassol.

Career
Khasa made his professional debut with Sion in a 0–0 Swiss Super League tie on 21 October 2018.

On 12 January 2022, Khasa joined Ligue 2 side Pau on loan until the end of the 2021–22 season.

Personal life
Born in France, Khasa is of Congolese descent.

References

External links
 
 FDB Profile
 SFL Profile

1997 births
Living people
People from Vernon, Eure
French footballers
French expatriate footballers
French sportspeople of Democratic Republic of the Congo descent
Association football forwards
FC Sion players
FC Fribourg players
Pau FC players
AEL Limassol players
Swiss Super League players
Ligue 2 players
Cypriot First Division players
French expatriate sportspeople in Switzerland
French expatriate sportspeople in Cyprus
Expatriate footballers in Switzerland
Expatriate footballers in Cyprus
Sportspeople from Eure
Footballers from Normandy
Black French sportspeople